Logashkino was a settlement in Nizhnekolymsky Ulus of the Sakha Republic, Russia, which was abolished in 1998.  It was a trading post on the shores of the Kolyma Bay, East Siberian Sea, located in the Logashkino harbor.   Elevation: .

The settlement was located just east of the mouth of the Alazeya River in an area of tundra, swamps, and lakes.

See also
Valkumey – Another Siberian ghost town

References

External links
Siberian crane

Geography of the Sakha Republic
East Siberian Sea
Former populated places in the Sakha Republic
Populated places of Arctic Russia